Nacra 17 European Championship is an annual European Championship sailing regatta in the Nacra 17 class organised by the Nacra 17 Class.

Editions

Medalists

References

Nacra 17 competitions
European championships in sailing
Recurring sporting events established in 2013